Peter Lundgren was the defending champion, but lost in the first round to David Pate.

Michael Chang won the title by defeating Johan Kriek 6–2, 6–3 in the final.

Seeds

Draw

Finals

Top half

Bottom half

References

External links
 Official results archive (ATP)
 Official results archive (ITF)

Singles